Fanconi anemia group C protein is a protein that in humans is encoded by the FANCC gene.

Structure

Function 

The protein encoded by this gene delays the onset of apoptosis and promotes homologous recombination repair of damaged DNA. Mutations in this gene result in Fanconi anemia.

A nuclear complex containing FANCC protein (as well as FANCA, FANCF and FANCG) is essential for the activation of the FANCD2 protein to the mono-ubiquitinated isoform.  In normal, non-mutant, cells FANCD2 is mono-ubiquinated in response to DNA damage. FANCC together with FANCE acts as the substrate adaptor for this reaction   Activated FANCD2 protein co-localizes with BRCA1 (breast cancer susceptibility protein) at ionizing radiation-induced foci and in synaptonemal complexes of meiotic chromosomes.  Activated FANCD2 protein may function prior to the initiation of meiotic recombination, perhaps to prepare chromosomes for synapsis, or to regulate subsequent recombination events.

FANCC(-/-) mutant male and female mice have compromised gametogenesis, leading to markedly impaired fertility, a characteristic of Fanconi anemia patients.  Both male and female FANCC mutant mice have reduced numbers of germ cells.

Interactions 

Fanconi anemia, complementation group C has been shown to interact with:

 Cdk1, 
 FANCA, 
 FANCE,
 FANCF, 
 GSTP1, 
 HSPA1A, 
 SPTAN1, 
 STAT1,  and
 ZBTB32.

References

Further reading

External links 
  GeneReviews/NCBI/NIH/UW entry on 9q22.3 Microdeletion
  GeneReviews/NCBI/NIH/UW entry on Fanconi Anemia or Pancytopenia